Maria Malibran is a 1943 Italian historical drama film directed by Guido Brignone and starring Maria Cebotari, Rossano Brazzi, and Renato Cialente. It is based on the life of the Spanish singer Maria Malibran.

It was shot at the Cinecittà Studios in Rome. The film's sets were designed by the art directors Virgilio Marchi and Gino Brosio.

Cast

References

Bibliography

External links 
 

1943 films
1940s historical musical films
Italian historical musical films
1940s Italian-language films
Films directed by Guido Brignone
Films shot at Cinecittà Studios
Films set in the 19th century
Films set in Paris
Films set in London
Films scored by Renzo Rossellini
1940s Italian films